Senecio macroglossus, the Natal ivy,  marguerite ivy, climbing senecio  or wax ivy, is a species of flowering plant in the family Asteraceae, native to southern Africa, from Zimbabwe and Mozambique to eastern South Africa.

Name

Despite its common name, and its resemblance to common ivy, it is not closely related to that group of plants. The Latin specific epithet macroglossus means "large tongue".

Description

Single, yellow, daisy-like composite flowerheads are borne in summer.

Cultivation
Numerous cultivars have been developed, of which 'Variegatus', with cream-coloured leaf margins, has gained the Royal Horticultural Society's Award of Garden Merit.

References

macroglossus
House plants